Maturango may refer to: 

 Maturango Museum in Ridgecrest, California
 Maturango Peak in the Argus Range